The 1969 Soviet Chess Championship was the 37th edition of USSR Chess Championship. Held from 7 September to 12 October 1969 in Moscow. The tournament was won by Tigran Petrosian who defeats Lev Polugaevsky in a play-off match. The final were preceded by semifinals events at Barnaul, Kiev, Rostov-on-Don and Voronezh. This Championship saw a return to a strong event with the unprecedented entry of 23 players. Petrosian made a come-back after having lost his world title to Spassky the year before. A big surprise in the semifinals was the failure of David Bronstein to qualify from the Kiev event.

Table and results

Play-off

References 

USSR Chess Championships
Championship
Chess
1969 in chess
Chess